Wazirabad–Narowal Branch Line is one of several branch lines in Pakistan, operated and maintained by Pakistan Railways. The line originally runs from Wazirabad Junction station to Narowal Junction station. There are 15 railway stations from Wazirabad Junction to Narowal Junction.

History
The Wazirabad–Narowal Branch Line was built by the North Western State Railway in 1915 and originally named as the Sialkot–Narowal Railway.

Stations
The railway stations on this railway line are:
 Wazirabad Junction
 Sodhra Kopra
 Begowala Ghartal
 Sambrial
 Sahowala
 Ugoki
 Sialkot Junction
 Tasirabad Halt
 Gunna Kalan
 Alhar
 Chawinda
 Pasrur
 Qila Sobha Singh
 Alipur Sayadan Sharif
 Domala
 Narowal Junction

See also
Pakistan Railways

References

Railway stations on Wazirabad–Narowal Branch Line
Railway lines opened in 1915
5 ft 6 in gauge railways in Pakistan